Neil Halstead (born 7 October 1970) is an English musician, widely known as singer, primary lyricist, and guitarist of shoegaze band Slowdive. He has been hailed by AllMusic as "one of Britain's most respected songwriters", and Time Out as "one of Britain's greatest songwriters".

Career
Halstead was born in Reading, Berkshire, England. He is a singer/guitarist and served as frontman and primary songwriter for the shoegazing band Slowdive, formed in 1989 out of his first band, the Pumpkin Fairies. Slowdive released the albums Just for a Day (1991), Souvlaki (1993), Pygmalion (1995) and Slowdive (2017).

Halstead also recorded with a side project called Zurich with members of Seefeel and Knives ov Resistance; the trio's sole album was released in 2009.

After their 1995 breakup, Slowdive morphed into the Halstead-helmed Mojave 3 and released a string of highly celebrated records that merged jangly alt-country with dusky psychedelic dream pop.

In 2006, Mojave 3 went on indefinite hiatus, prompting Halstead to embark on an acoustic-driven solo career marked by an emphasis on British folk-inspired melody and a love of surfing. An occasional drift into more whimsical territory prompted NME to describe Halstead as "like Syd Barrett if he’d ever set foot on a surf board". Halstead's first solo album, Sleeping on Roads, was released in 2001, followed by Oh! Mighty Engine (2008), released on friend and fellow surfer Jack Johnson's Brushfire Records label. Halstead's third solo album, Palindrome Hunches, was released in 2012; it was described as "an exquisite set of dark folk music" by The Times, while God Is In The TV called it "undoubtedly one of the finest British records released this year".

Halstead formed the project Black Hearted Brother in 2013, releasing one album, Stars Are Our Home.

Slowdive, including Halstead, reformed in 2014, and released their fourth self-titled album in 2017.

In 2015, Halstead served as the touring guitarist for Sun Kil Moon on select European dates, including their appearance at the Primavera Sound festival.

Solo discography

Studio albums
 Sleeping on Roads (2001, 4AD)
Seasons – 05:23
Two Stones in My Pocket – 04:27
Driving With Bert – 06:17
Hi-Lo and Inbetween – 04:47
See You on Rooftops – 06:34
Martha's Mantra (For the Pain) – 05:11
Sleeping on Roads – 04:17
Dreamed I Saw Soldiers – 06:20
High Hopes – 05:04
 Oh! Mighty Engine (2008, Brushfire)
 Palindrome Hunches (2012, Brushfire)

Guest appearances
 "Has Your Mind Got Away?" – Friends and Lovers by Bernard Butler (1999, Creation Records)
 "Away" – Shelter by Alcest (2014, Prophecy Productions)
 "Lonely Heart Reverb", "Cloudy Heart" and "Lover"  – Cross the Verge by Joana Serrat (2016, Loose)

References

4AD artists
Brushfire Records artists
Living people
1970 births
Shoegaze musicians
Alternative rock guitarists
British rock guitarists
British male guitarists
People from Reading, Berkshire
21st-century British guitarists
21st-century British male musicians